Justin Louis "Joba" Chamberlain (né Heath;  ; born September 23, 1985) is an American former professional baseball pitcher. He played in Major League Baseball (MLB) for the New York Yankees, Detroit Tigers, Kansas City Royals, and Cleveland Indians.

Chamberlain played college baseball for the Nebraska Cornhuskers before the Yankees selected him in the first round of the 2006 MLB draft. He ascended through the minor leagues and made his MLB debut in 2007 as a relief pitcher during the Yankees' pursuit of a berth in the MLB postseason. The Yankees adhered to what became known as the "Joba Rules", where they carefully monitored and limited his appearances. During the 2008 season, the Yankees transitioned Chamberlain to the starting rotation, and he suffered a shoulder injury later in the season. Chamberlain struggled as a starter in 2009, and was shifted back to a relief role. He signed as a free agent with the Tigers before the 2014 season, and re-signed with the Tigers for 2015, but was released during the season. He returned to MLB later in 2015 with Kansas City and pitched for Cleveland in 2016.

Early life
Chamberlain was born Justin Louis Heath on September 23, 1985. He grew up in Lincoln, Nebraska. Chamberlain's parents, Harlan Chamberlain and Jackie Standley, were never married and split up when Joba was 18 months old. Some sources say that Harlan Chamberlain obtained full custody of Joba when he was three years old, but Standley claims that Joba lived with her most of the time until he was 10 when she had his surname legally changed from Heath, her maiden name, to Chamberlain. Standley began abusing drugs when Joba was 4 or 5 and says that she and Joba speak to each other only rarely.

Chamberlain's father was born on the Winnebago Indian Reservation, but had to leave to be treated for polio. Chamberlain still has family living on Native American reservations. As of 2014, he was one of only three active non-Hispanic Native American players in Major League Baseball, with the others being Kyle Lohse of the Milwaukee Brewers and Jacoby Ellsbury of the New York Yankees.

When Chamberlain (then Justin) was a little boy, his two-year-old cousin was unable to pronounce her brother (Chamberlain's other cousin) Joshua's name correctly, pronouncing it as Joba instead, which became Chamberlain's nickname over time.

Chamberlain served as a ball boy and bat boy for Lincoln Northeast High School's state championship baseball team, and eventually graduated from Northeast. He did not jump straight to college; to help pay the bills, Joba briefly worked for the city of Lincoln's maintenance department.

Amateur baseball career

High school
Chamberlain played American Legion Baseball over the summer of 2004 for Coach Steve Eckman, going 4–4 with a 1.36 earned run average (ERA), as he struck out 137 hitters and walked only 21 en route to all-state honors.  He recorded 21 strikeouts over 12 shutout innings in a matchup against future fellow Nebraska star Johnny Dorn's team, a 15-inning game won by Grand Island, 1–0.  He also hit .505 with 11 homers, 11 doubles and 37 RBI as a two-way performer.  At Lincoln Northeast High School for coaches Bill Fagler and Doug Kaltenberger he garnered second-team Super State honors from the Lincoln Journal Star, going 3–2 with a 3.35 ERA, as he struck out 29 in 31.1 innings as a senior.

College
Chamberlain started his college career playing for the University of Nebraska at Kearney Lopers under coach Damon Day, leading the team in ERA (5.23), opponents' batting average (.250), strikeouts (49), and complete games (4) in just eight starts as a freshman, before transferring to the University of Nebraska-Lincoln. He helped the Cornhuskers reach the 2005 College World Series, and helped lead Nebraska to its first College World Series win. He had a 10–2 won/loss record with a 2.81 ERA for the year, and his 2005 stats included 5 double-digit strikeout games. Triceps tendinitis limited his 2006 season but he still pitched in 14 games, posting a 6–5 record with a 3.93 ERA and 102 strikeouts in 89.1 innings.

During the 2004–2005 college off-season Chamberlain pitched for the Nebraska Bruins of the National Baseball Congress. He started six games in 2005, recording a 5–0 record and a 1.59 ERA.

Professional baseball career

Minor leagues
Chamberlain was drafted 41st overall by the New York Yankees in the 2006 Major League Baseball draft; the Yankees received that draft pick as free agent compensation for Tom Gordon, who signed with the Philadelphia Phillies. Chamberlain did not pitch in the organized minors during the 2006 season, but pitched in the winter league in Hawaii, posting a 2.63 ERA for the West Oahu CaneFires.

Before the 2007 season, Baseball America ranked Chamberlain as the fourth-best prospect in the pitching-rich Yankee organization, and the 75th-best prospect in Major League Baseball, and ranked his fastball as the best in the Yankee farm system.

He spent the first part of his 2007 season on the Single-A Advanced Tampa Yankees in the Florida State League. He went 4–0 with a 2.03 ERA in seven games, and had 51 strikeouts and 11 walks. He was then promoted to the Double-A Trenton Thunder in the Eastern League, where he was 4–2 in seven games with a 3.43 ERA and 64 strikeouts. He was named to the U.S. Team in the 2007 All-Star Futures Game July 8 at AT&T Park. Chamberlain pitched the third inning, striking out one, walking one, and allowing a hit and an earned run. On July 24, 2007, Chamberlain was promoted to Triple-A Scranton/Wilkes-Barre, and made his first start the next day, striking out 10 in five innings and earning his first Triple-A victory. While the Yankees still saw him as a starter in the future, the team announced on July 29, 2007, that Chamberlain would be moved to the Scranton-Wilkes Barre bullpen, and he made his first appearance the next day, striking out the side in one inning pitched and hitting 100 on the radar gun three times. On August 1, Chamberlain went back to Trenton to make a relief appearance, striking out two batters in a 1–2–3 eighth inning. He then came back to Scranton, pitching two innings and striking out five batters.

New York Yankees

2007–2009
On August 7, 2007, the Yankees purchased Chamberlain's contract, elevating him to the major leagues for the first time in his career. In his debut, a Yankees victory over the Toronto Blue Jays, Chamberlain struck out the first batter he faced and went on to pitch two scoreless innings, striking out two. Chamberlain's usage in games was initially restricted by what were referred to as the "Joba Rules", which prevented him from pitching on consecutive days and gave him an additional day of rest for each inning pitched in an outing. On August 30, 2007, during a game against the Boston Red Sox, Chamberlain threw two pitches over the head of Kevin Youkilis. Chamberlain was subsequently ejected for the first time in his Major League career. The next day, Chamberlain was suspended for two games and fined $1,000.

In Game 2 of the 2007 ALDS against the Cleveland Indians, Chamberlain was pitching in the bottom of the eighth with the Yankees leading 1–0. Suddenly, a host of small midges swarmed the field. He was repeatedly sprayed down with insect repellent, which had no apparent deterrent effect on the midges. Chamberlain threw two wild pitches, yielding the tying run. The Indians went on to win the game 2–1. The Yankees would then lose the Division Series against the Indians in four games in the best-of-five series.

On March 20, 2008, the Yankees announced that Chamberlain would start the season in the bullpen. Manager Joe Girardi stated that Chamberlain would be used 'without restrictions' but that the team's use of Chamberlain would be guided by common sense.

Chamberlain was granted a leave of absence on April 13, 2008, when he received news that his father, Harlan, was in the hospital after collapsing at his home in Lincoln, Nebraska. At the time of his leave, Joba had a record of 1–0, with a 0.00 ERA, six strikeouts, and three holds in four games and 5 innings pitched. Chamberlain returned from the bereavement in time for the 2nd game against the Baltimore Orioles on April 19, 2008. On April 20, Hank Steinbrenner announced that he wanted Chamberlain to be moved into the rotation.

In May, Girardi announced Chamberlain was being transitioned into the starting rotation. On June 3, Chamberlain made his first MLB start against Roy Halladay and the Toronto Blue Jays lasting only 2 innings while allowing two runs, a hit and four walks. On June 25, Chamberlain earned his first career win as a starter, throwing 6 scoreless innings against the Pittsburgh Pirates, en route to a 10–0 Yankees victory.

On July 25, Chamberlain threw seven shutout innings against the Red Sox, outdueling Red Sox ace Josh Beckett, allowing only three hits and striking out nine batters. The Yankees won the game 1–0.

On August 4, Chamberlain injured his shoulder in a game against the Texas Rangers and was placed on the 15-day disabled list with rotator cuff tendinitis. Yankees General Manager Brian Cashman later acknowledged that this injury had a lasting effect.

Chamberlain ended the season with a 3–1 record and eight no-decisions.

2009–2013

Chamberlain learned about his role in the Yankees rotation in November, and stated that knowing about the team's plans to use him as a starter rather than as a reliever who would move into a starting role at some point in the middle of the season (as was the case in 2008) changes his mental approach to preparing for the season, and makes things easier on him. During the All-Star break, Chamberlain went back home to Lincoln, Nebraska to get his mind off things by playing with his son so he could "be himself" and get more confidence on the mound. Chamberlain continued to struggle in the second half of the season. The Yankees considered demoting him to the minor leagues and leaving him off of the postseason roster, but the Yankees kept Chamberlain on the roster in a set-up role as the Yankees went with a three-man starting rotation en route to winning the 2009 World Series.

Heading into the new season, before spring training Yankees manager Joe Girardi declared that there would be competition for the fifth spot in the Yankees starting rotation. The favorites were most notably Chamberlain and Phil Hughes. Towards the end of spring training, Hughes was declared the winner, which sent Chamberlain back to the bullpen. From the start of the season through July Chamberlain struggled, with an ERA over 5. His performance improved in August and September; in Chamberlain's last 28 appearances of the 2010 regular season, his ERA was 2.38.

The Yankees ruled out using Chamberlain as a starting pitcher in 2011 arguing that his pitches have greater velocity when he pitches in relief.  At the beginning of the season, he was moved to the seventh-inning role to accommodate Rafael Soriano. He would later become the set-up man to Mariano Rivera briefly after Soriano went on the disabled list. Chamberlain was placed on the 15 day-disabled list on June 8 due to an elbow injury. He had Tommy John surgery performed on June 16 to repair a torn ligament in his right elbow and was knocked out for the rest of the season.

In January 2012, the Yankees and Chamberlain agreed on a one-year, non-guaranteed contract worth approximately $1.675 million. On March 22, 2012, Chamberlain injured his right leg while bouncing on a trampoline in a Tampa jump center; he suffered an open dislocation of his ankle. Initial reports indicated that he had lost so much blood that onlookers at the scene feared that he might bleed to death. Chamberlain, however, later discredited these accusations during a press conference stating that he never suffered any life-threatening injury nor did he lose much blood. Chamberlain began the 2012 season on the 60-day disabled list due to the ankle injury, and he was recovering from the Tommy John surgery he had previously. He returned on August 1, 2012, against the Baltimore Orioles.

In the top of the 12th inning of Game 4 of the 2012 American League Division Series, Chamberlain was struck on the elbow by a broken bat by Matt Wieters of the Orioles and left the game. Despite his injury, the Yankees won the series over Baltimore in five games, but were swept in the 2012 American League Championship Series by the Detroit Tigers.

On May 2, 2013, Chamberlain was placed on the 15-day disabled list with a right oblique strain. He was activated from the DL on May 28, 2013.

On September 5, 2013, Chamberlain was ejected for the second time in his major league career in a 9–8 Yankees loss against the Red Sox. With Jacoby Ellsbury on second after a stolen base and Shane Victorino at the plate with one out in the 10th inning, Victorino attempted to check his swing on a 1–2 pitch. First base umpire Joe West said Victorino did not swing and Victorino then singled in the go-ahead run on the very next pitch. Chamberlain was then ejected by West for arguing the check swing call after being removed from the game.

Detroit Tigers

2014–2015

On December 13, 2013, the Tigers signed Chamberlain to a one-year contract, worth $2.5 million plus incentives. Chamberlain began the year as the Tigers' set-up man. Chamberlain earned a save on April 22, 2014, in an 8–6 win over the Chicago White Sox, which was only the sixth of his career. Chamberlain was given the save opportunity after Phil Coke was handed an 8–3 lead and surrendered three runs, while closer Joe Nathan was given rest due to recent struggles. Chamberlain finished the 2014 season with a 2–5 record and a 3.57 ERA, allowing 57 hits in 63 innings with 24 walks and 59 strikeouts.

On February 24, 2015, the Tigers re-signed Chamberlain to one-year, $1 million contract plus incentives. He had a 1.26 ERA through May, but his ERA increased to 4.09 in his next ten appearances. He allowed nine runs, eight earned, on 14 hits over 7 innings since June 1. He was designated for assignment by the Tigers on July 3. On July 10, 2015, Chamberlain was given his unconditional release.

Toronto Blue Jays
On July 21, 2015, Chamberlain signed a minor league contract with the Toronto Blue Jays. He was assigned to the Buffalo Bisons of the International League. Chamberlain exercised an opt-out in his contract on August 14, and became a free agent.

Kansas City Royals
On August 16, 2015, Chamberlain signed a minor league contract with the Kansas City Royals. After pitching in eight games for the Omaha Storm Chasers of the Class AAA Pacific Coast League, the Royals promoted Chamberlain to the major leagues on September 7. In six appearances for the Royals, Chamberlain has a 7.94 ERA. Overall, Chamberlain's ERA was 4.88 in 36 total games combined with both the Tigers and Royals in 2015. He was designated for assignment on October 27, 2015, the same day the Royals played the first game of the 2015 World Series. The Royals would eventually beat the New York Mets in five games of the postseason finals, giving them their first championship in 30 years. Despite playing in only a few games for the Royals in the regular season that year, he received his second World Series ring.

Cleveland Indians
On December 1, 2015, Chamberlain signed a minor league deal with the Cleveland Indians. The Indians purchased his contract on April 4, 2016, and added him to the opening day roster. He was designated for assignment on July 4, and released July 10, 2016, after declining an outright assignment.

Milwaukee Brewers
On January 20, 2017, Chamberlain signed a minor league contract with the Milwaukee Brewers with an invite to spring training. On March 22, Chamberlain was released. He announced his retirement on October 4, 2017.

Pitching repertoire
Chamberlain threw a four-seam fastball that early in his career was regularly in the mid-to-upper 90s, topping out at 101 mph. After his arm surgery, his fastball was in the 93-94 mph range, topping out around 97–98. He also threw a slider anywhere from 82 to 88 mph, a curveball at 78–81 mph, and an occasional changeup at 83–85 mph.

Personal life

Chamberlain has one son, Karter. Chamberlain made an appearance in the season 2 episode 15 episode of Man v. Food which airs on the Travel Channel. The episode was filmed in Brooklyn and featured Chamberlain coaching host Adam Richman through an eating challenge.

DUI conviction
On October 18, 2008, at 1:00 a.m. Chamberlain was arrested near Lincoln, Nebraska for the suspicion of driving under the influence, speeding, and having an open container of alcohol in his vehicle.  A Nebraska State Patrol spokesperson said Chamberlain was stopped for speeding on U.S. Route 77 near Lincoln. His arrest was captured on police video, which later aired on the "Drivers 13" episode of truTV Presents: World's Dumbest.... His arraignment was postponed four times: in December 2008, January 2009, and twice in March 2009, all by Chamberlain's request. He pleaded guilty to drunk driving and was sentenced to probation on April 1, 2009.

Awards
2005 3rd Team All-American
2005 1st Team All Big 12
2005 Big 12 Newcomer Pitcher of the Year
2005 2nd Team All Midwest Region
2005 Big 12 Pitcher of the Week (2005-03-01)
2005 National Pitcher of the Week (2005-01-03)
2005 Big 12 Pitcher of the Week (2005-04-25)
2006 1st Team Preseason All-American
2006 Hawaiian Winter Post-Season All-Star
2007 FSL Pitcher of the Week (2007-05-14)
2007 FSL Pitcher of the Week (2007-05-28)
2007 EL Pitcher of the Week (2007-06-18)
2009 World Series champion

See also

References

External links

Minor League Baseball stats
Huskers.com Awards, Bio, and Stats
 Joba's First MLB Interview – Audio file on blog

1985 births
Baseball players from Nebraska
Buffalo Bisons (minor league) players
Cleveland Indians players
Detroit Tigers players
Gulf Coast Yankees players
Winnebago Tribe of Nebraska people
Kansas City Royals players
Living people
Major League Baseball pitchers
Native American baseball players
Nebraska Cornhuskers baseball players
Nebraska–Kearney Lopers baseball players
New York Yankees players
Omaha Storm Chasers players
Scranton/Wilkes-Barre RailRiders players
Scranton/Wilkes-Barre Yankees players
Sportspeople from Lincoln, Nebraska
Tampa Yankees players
Trenton Thunder players
West Oahu Canefires players
Lincoln Northeast High School alumni
20th-century Native Americans
21st-century Native Americans